Lutetium vanadate is inorganic compound with ferromagnetic and semiconducting properties, with the chemical formula of Lu2V2O7 with the same structure as pyrochlore.

Preparation
Lutetium vanadate can be obtained by the reaction between lutetium oxide, vanadium trioxide and vanadium pentoxide at a high temperature (1400 °C) in an argon atmosphere with oxygen pressure of 2.0×10−5 bar.
 2 Lu2O3 + V2O3 + V2O5 → 2 Lu2V2O7

See also
Ytterbium-doped lutetium orthovanadate

References

Lutetium compounds
Vanadates
Vanadium(IV) compounds